Jodie Esquibel (born 7 May 1986) is an American mixed martial artist who most recently competed in the Ultimate Fighting Championship. She has also fought for Invicta FC.

Mixed martial arts career

Early career
Esquibel made her professional MMA debut in April 2011 as part of the Jackson's MMA Series. She won her first two bouts before signing with Invicta Fighting Championships.

Invicta FC
Esquibel made her Invicta FC debut against Liz McCarthy at Invicta FC 4: Esparza vs. Hyatt on January 5, 2013. She won the fight by split decision.

Esquibel next faced Alex Chambers at Invicta FC 5: Penne vs. Waterson on April 5, 2013. She lost the fight via submission in the first round, the first loss of her professional MMA career.

The Ultimate Fighter
In April 2016, it was announced that Esquibel would be a contestant on The Ultimate Fighter: Team Joanna vs. Team Cláudia. She was defeated by Ashley Yoder via split decision in the opening qualifying round.

Ultimate Fighting Championship
Esquibel made her UFC debut against Karolina Kowalkiewicz on October 21, 2017 at UFC Fight Night: Cowboy vs. Till. She lost the fight by unanimous decision.

Esquibel was scheduled to face Jessica Aguilar on June 1, 2018 at UFC Fight Night 131. Aguilar successfully weighed in, but the bout was removed from the card the day of the event by the NYSAC due to a concern over a medical issue with Aguilar. The pair eventually faced each other at UFC Fight Night 133 on July 14, 2018. Esquibel lost the bout via unanimous decision.

Esquibel was scheduled to face Jessica Penne on February 17, 2019 at UFC on ESPN 1. At the weigh-ins, Penne weighed in at 118 pounds, 2 pounds over the strawweight non-title fight upper limit of 116 pounds. As a result, the bout proceeded at catchweight and Penne was fined 20% of her purse which went to Esquibel.  However Penne then injured herself on the morning of the fight and the bout was cancelled. The pairs was rescheduled to meet on April 27, 2019 at UFC Fight Night: Jacaré vs. Hermansson. However, it was reported on April 18 that Penne pulled out of the bout due to injury and she was replaced by Angela Hill Esquibel lost the bout via unanimous decision.

Esquibel faced Hannah Cifers on August 17, 2019 at UFC 241. She lost the fight by unanimous decision.

On March 19, 2020, it was reported that Esquibel was no longer part of the UFC's roster.

Return to Invicta Fighting Championships 
Esquibel faced Liz Tracy at Invicta FC 44: A New Era on August 27, 2021. Esquibel lost via split decision.

Mixed martial arts record

|-
|Loss
|align=center|6–7
|Liz Tracy
|Decision (split)
|Invicta FC 44: A New Era
|
|align=center|3
|align=center|5:00
|Kansas City, Kansas, United States
|
|-
|Loss
|align=center|6–6
|Hannah Cifers
|Decision (unanimous)
|UFC 241 
|
|align=center|3
|align=center|5:00
|Anaheim, California, United States
|
|-
|Loss
|align=center|6–5
|Angela Hill
|Decision (unanimous)
|UFC Fight Night: Jacaré vs. Hermansson 
|
|align=center|3
|align=center|5:00
|Sunrise, Florida, United States
|
|- 
|Loss
|align=center|6–4
|Jessica Aguilar
|Decision (unanimous)
|UFC Fight Night: dos Santos vs. Ivanov
|
|align=center|3
|align=center|5:00
|Boise, Idaho, United States
|
|-
|Loss
|align=center|6–3
|Karolina Kowalkiewicz
|Decision (unanimous)
|UFC Fight Night: Cowboy vs. Till
|
|align=center|3
|align=center|5:00
|Gdańsk, Poland
|
|-
|Win
|align="center" |6–2
|DeAnna Bennett
|Decision (split)
|Invicta FC 22: Evinger vs. Kunitskaya II
|
|align="center" | 3
|align="center" | 5:00
|Kansas City, Missouri, United States
|
|-
|Loss
|align="center" |5–2
|Alexa Grasso
|Decision (unanimous)
|Invicta FC 18: Grasso vs. Esquibel
|
|align="center" | 3
|align="center" | 5:00
|Kansas City, Missouri, United States
|
|-
|Win
|align="center" |5–1
|Nicdali Rivera-Calanoc
|Decision (unanimous)
|Invicta FC 9: Honchak vs. Hashi
|
|align="center" | 3
|align="center" | 5:00
|Davenport, Iowa, United States
|
|-
|Win
|align="center" |4–1
|Jinh Yu Frey
|Decision (split)
|Invicta FC 8: Waterson vs. Tamada
|
|align="center" | 3
|align="center" | 5:00
|Kansas City, Missouri, United States
|
|-
|Loss
|align="center" |3–1
|Alex Chambers
|Submission (rear-naked choke)
|Invicta FC 5: Penne vs. Waterson
|
|align="center" | 1
|align="center" | 1:35
|Kansas City, Missouri, United States
|
|-
|Win
|align="center" |3–0
|Liz McCarthy
|Decision (split)
|Invicta FC 4: Esparza vs. Hyatt
|
|align="center" | 3
|align="center" | 5:00
|Kansas City, Kansas, United States
|
|-
|Win
|align="center" |2–0
|Amy Riehle 
|Decision (unanimous)
|Jackson's MMA Series 7
|
|align="center" | 3
|align="center" | 5:00
|Albuquerque, New Mexico, United States
|
|-
|Win
|align="center" |1–0
|Brittany Horton
|TKO (head kick and punches)
|Jackson's MMA Series 4
|
|align="center" | 1
|align="center" | 3:59
|Albuquerque, New Mexico, United States
|
|-
|}

Professional boxing record

References

External links
 
 

1986 births
Living people
American female mixed martial artists
Atomweight mixed martial artists
Sportspeople from Albuquerque, New Mexico
American women boxers
Strawweight mixed martial artists
Mixed martial artists utilizing boxing
Ultimate Fighting Championship female fighters
21st-century American women